The CE-7.5 is a cryogenic rocket engine developed by the Indian Space Research Organisation to power the upper stage of its GSLV Mk-2 launch vehicle. The engine was developed as a part of the Cryogenic Upper Stage Project (CUSP). It replaced the KVD-1 (RD-56) Russian cryogenic engine that powered the upper stage of GSLV Mk-1.

Overview 
CE-7.5 is a regeneratively-cooled, variable-thrust, fuel-rich staged combustion cycle rocket engine.

Specifications 
The specifications and key characteristics of the engine are:
 Operating Cycle – Staged combustion
 Propellant Combination – LOX / LH2
 Maximum thrust (Vacuum) – 73.55 kN
 Operating Thrust Range (as demonstrated during GSLV Mk2  D5 flight) – 73.55 kN to 82 kN 
 Engine Specific Impulse - 
 Engine Burn Duration (Nom) – 720 seconds
 Propellant Mass – 12,800 kg
 Two independent regulators:  thrust control and mixture ratio control
 Steering during thrust:  provided by two gimballed steering engines

Development 
ISRO formally started the Cryogenic Upper Stage Project in 1994. The engine successfully completed the Flight Acceptance Hot Test in 2008, and was integrated with propellant tanks, third-stage structures and associated feed lines for the first launch. The first flight attempt took place in April 2010 during the GSLV Mk.II D3/GSAT-3 mission. The engine ignited, but the ignition did not sustain as the Fuel Booster Turbo Pump (FBTP) shut down after reaching a speed of about 34,500 rpm 480 milliseconds after ignition, due to the FBTP being starved of Liquid Hydrogen (LH2). On 27 March 2013 the engine was successfully tested under vacuum conditions. The engine performed as expected and was qualified to power the third stage of the GSLV Mk-2 rocket. On 5 January 2014 the cryogenic engine performed successfully and launched the GSAT-14 satellite in the GSLV-D5/GSAT-14 mission.

Applications 
CE-7.5 is being used in the third stage of ISRO's GSLV Mk.II rocket.

See also 
 
 CE-20
 GSLV

References 

Rocket engines of India
Rocket engines using hydrogen propellant
Rocket engines using the staged combustion cycle